Venette is a commune in the Oise department in northern France. The town is located along the river Oise, near Compiègne.

Population
Its inhabitants are called Venettiens. There are about 2800 inhabitants (2012).

See also
 Communes of the Oise department

References

Communes of Oise